Holiday in Havana is a 1949 American  musical comedy directed by Jean Yarbrough, and starring Desi Arnaz, Mary Hatcher and Ann Doran. The film is about a Cuban hotel busboy (Arnaz) who dreams of becoming a composer. According to author Mary Beltrán, in his portrayal of Carlos Estrada, Arnaz "established a successful negotiation of tensions inherent in playing a Latin romantic lead in this period, a negotiation that set the stage for what would make Ricky Ricardo so popular with American viewers. His music, with songs such as "Holiday in Havana" and the "Arnaz Jam" featured in the film.

Plot summary

The story about the difficult role of a Cuban bandleader Carlos Estrada (Desi Arnaz). His romantic vis-a-vis is a peppery dancer named Lolita Valdez (Mary Hatcher). Just before the lovers participate in a gala Havana festival, Carlos has a lot of explaining to do when Lolita catches him in the arms of another.

Cast
 Desi Arnaz as Carlos Estrada
 Mary Hatcher as Lolita Valdez (Dolores)
 Ann Doran as Marge Henley
 Steven Geray as Lopez
 Minerva Urecal as Mama Valdez
 Sig Arno as Pepe
 Ray Walker as Sam Keegan
 Nacho Galindo as Police Sergeant

References

External links
 
 
 
 

American musical comedy films
1949 musical comedy films
1949 films
Columbia Pictures films
Films directed by Jean Yarbrough
Films set in Havana
American black-and-white films
1940s American films